Scytasis is a genus of longhorn beetles of the subfamily Lamiinae, containing the following species:

 Scytasis nitida Pascoe, 1867
 Scytasis sericea Gardner, 1930

References

Saperdini